Torrelameu is a municipality in the  comarca of Noguera, in the province of Lleida, Catalonia, Spain.

Economy is based on agriculture (cereals, wheat, maize, potatoes, vegetables, alfalfa, vines and others) and animal husbandry.

References

External links
Official website 
 Government data pages 

Municipalities in Noguera (comarca)
Populated places in Noguera (comarca)